The 2016 Rally de Portugal (formally the 50. Vodafone Rally de Portugal 2016) was the fifth round of the 2016 World Rally Championship. The race was held over four days between 19 May and 22 May 2016, and was based in Matosinhos, Portugal. Citroën's Kris Meeke won the race, his 2nd win in the World Rally Championship.

Entry list

Overall standings

Special stages

Power Stage
The "Power stage" was a  stage at the end of the rally.

References

Portugal
Rally de Portugal
Rally